is a railway station in Tennoji-ku, Osaka, Japan, served by the Kintetsu Railway's Osaka, Nara, and Namba Lines. Trains on the Nara Line arrive at and depart from an underground platform. The station is connected to Tanimachi Kyuchome Station on the Tanimachi Line (T25) and the Sennichimae Line (S18) of the Osaka Metro. It has been the Kintetsu Railway's terminus since the Nara Line was opened in 1914.

The station is also known as  since it is located in Uehommachi Rokuchōme (or Ueroku for short), which is currently used as the name of the connecting bus stops.

Layout
The station has two side platforms serving two tracks on the third basement level, and seven bay platforms serving six tracks on the first floor.

Surroundings

the headquarters of Kintetsu Group
Kintetsu Department Store Uehommachi
Uehommachi Yufura
Shinkabukiza
Sheraton Miyako Hotel Osaka
Uehommachi Hi-Hi Town
Oaska Red Cross Hospital
Tanimachi Kyuchome Station (Osaka Metro)
International House, Osaka
Hotel Awina Osaka
Uenomiya Junior/Senior High School
Seifu Junior/Senior High School

Buses
Osaka City Bus
Uehommachi Rokuchome
Route 18 for  via Miyukidori / for Tamatsukuri via Uehommachi Itchome
Route 22 for Suwa Jinja-mae via Tsuruhashi-ekimae and Tamatsukuri / for  via Tennoji Kumin Center and Tennoji Kuyakusho
Route 62 for Sumiyoshishako-mae via Uehommachi Hatchome and Abenobashi / for  via 
Route 73 for  via Katsuyama Yonchome and  / for 
Uehommachi Rokuchome-minami
Route 62 for Abenobashi and Sumiyoshishako-mae via Uehommachi Hatchome / for Osaka-ekimae (Osaka Station) via Temmabashi
Uehommachi Rokuchome-higashi
Route 18 for Kita-Tatsumi Bus Terminal via Miyukidori
Route 22 for Suwa Jinja-mae via Tsuruhashi-ekimae and Tamatsukuri
Route 73 for Deto Bus Terminal via Katsuyama Yonchome and Kumata
Uehommachi Nanachome-kita
Route 62 for Uehommachi Rokuchome-minami and Osaka-ekimae (Osaka Station)

Kintetsu Bus Co., Ltd.
from the south of the station (Kintetsu Uehommachi Station)
Route 01 for Osaka Red Cross Hospital (Not running on Saturdays, Sundays, holidays, May 1 and from December 29 until January 3)
Route 66 for  via Osaka Police Hospital (Not running on Saturdays, Sundays, holidays, and from December 30 until January 4)
Abeno-Uehommachi Shuttle Buses from Sheraton Miyako Hotel Osaka (Kintetsu Uehommachi)
Route 11 for Abenobashi (Abeno Harukas) via Matsuyamachi-suji Avenue (7 buses per day, 10:05 a.m., 11:05 a.m., 12:05 p.m., 1:05 p.m., 2:05 p.m., 3:05 p.m. and 4:05 p.m. buses)
Route 12 for Abenobashi-higashiguchi (Miyako City Osaka Tennoji) via Shitenno-ji Sandoguchi (from the 7:35 p.m. bus until the last one)

airport limousine (Kintetsu Uehommachi)
for Osaka International Airport (departing from bus station on the 2nd floor of Ōsaka Uehommachi Station; operated by Osaka Airport Transport Co., Ltd.)
for Kansai International Airport (departing from Sheraton Miyako Hotel Osaka; operated by Kintetsu Bus Co., Ltd. and Kansai Airport Transportation Enterprise Co., Ltd.)

tour bus (Kintetsu Bus Co., Ltd.)
Osaka Sky Vista (departing from bus station on the 2nd floor of Ōsaka Uehommachi Station)
From the starting in 2014, Osaka Sky Vista started Uehommachi and passed Osaka Museum of History, Osaka Castle, Nakanoshima, Midosuji, Dotombori, Den Den Town, Tsutenkaku and Shitenno-ji. It does not run on Wednesdays. Passengers could get off at Abeno Harukas or Uehommachi. Osaka Sky Vista has started from JR Osaka Station since February 1, 2016.

Adjacent stations

References 

Railway stations in Japan opened in 1914
Railway stations in Osaka Prefecture